Rozalia Mancewicz (born 27 June 1987) is a Polish beauty pageant titleholder who was crowned Miss Polonia 2010 and represented her country in Miss Universe 2011 and in Miss International 2012.

Early life
A native of Pomigacze, Mancewicz is a student of English at the University of Białystok, aiming to become an interpreter.

Miss Tourism Queen International 2005
Prior to her participation in Miss Polonia, Mancewicz was the official representative of her country to the 2005 Miss Tourism Queen International pageant held in Hangzhou, where she placed third runner-up to eventual winner, Nikoletta Ralli of Greece.

Miss Polonia 2010

References

External links
Official Miss Polonia website

1987 births
Living people
Polish beauty pageant winners
Miss Universe 2011 contestants
Australian emigrants to Poland
Miss International 2012 delegates
Polish female models
Miss Polonia winners